The Next Level is the sixth studio album by Diljit Dosanjh, released on 20 August 2009 worldwide making one of his most successful albums. It was also released internationally to US, Canada, and UK.

The Next Level was released under the banner of T-Series. With the music of Honey Singh, the album contained eight tracks. "Dil Nachda" was written by Balvir Boparai and four songs are written by Pirti Silon, two of them by the pen of Satta Kotliwala and one other by Honey Singh.

The album was preceded by the lead single, "Dil Nachda" which impacted worldwide. Following the success of his first single, "Panga" was released which was another success. The album received positive reviews.

Track listing

References

2009 albums